Marie Crous (fl. 1641) was a French mathematician.  She introduced the decimal system to France in the 17th century.

Biography 
Coming from a modest origin, Marie Crous became an accomplished writer and teacher at Charlotte-Rose de Caumont La Force. She was first published in 1636; by 1641, she published a study on the decimal system, which she dedicated to "the saffron-tinted princess" Madame de Combalet, Duchesse d'Aiguillon, niece of Cardinal de Richelieu and a well known patron; she was a friend of Marin Mersenne. However, Marie Crous would never be cited by the eminent members of the academics and scientists within the Minim Roman Catholic religious order, who dominated scientific research in France during that period, and she was never acknowledged as a woman of learning.

Her work, printed by Simon Stevin, goes well beyond what was provided at the time in calculation manuals. She wrote,  Her work introduced two fundamental innovations: the decimal point (today called the virgule in French) to separate the mantissa of the decimal parts, as well as the use of a zero in the decimal part to indicate that a place is absent. In doing this, she gave form to current decimal numbers. She named the zeroes nuls as the Germans were doing.

Talented in writing as well as mathematics, she developed among other things the method of Pestalozzi and what she called denominational division, which has great utility for mental calculations, notably in its application in the rule of three.

Crous' work (the first edition dates to 1635–1636) begins with an epistle to her noble patron. She expresses gratitude for her help in these terms:

Nevertheless, she does not attribute the merit of her inventions to her. In the preface of her Abrégé recherche (Research Abstract), Marie Crous assures that she made her work

In her preface to Charlotte de Caumont, she referred to trades workers in construction in Paris, who were at that time beginning to replace pre-metric units of measurement, such as the toise, with measurements in tenths as a more efficient system:

From this perspective, Marie Crous provided a basis for the decimal metric system.

Mathematician Olry Terquem regretted that her name had not yet been given to a street in Paris.  More recently, Catherine Goldstein devoted part of her article, "Neither public nor private: mathematics in early modern France" to Crous.

See also 

0 (number)
Mantissa
Significand
Rule of three (mathematics)
Johann Heinrich Pestalozzi

References 

  Catherine Goldstein,  Neither public nor private: mathematics in early modern France.
  Abrégée recherche de Marie Crous, pour tirer la solution de toute proposition d'arithmétique, dépendantes des règles y contenues ; avec quelques propositions sur les changes, escomptes, intérêt, compagnie, associations, paiements, départements de deniers, mélanges, bureau des monnaies et toisages, divisé en trois parties. ENsemble un avis sur les dixmes ou dixièmes du sieur Stevin, à Paris, chez Jacques Auvray. 1661.
 M. Olry Terquem, published by T. Bachelier, article on Marie Crous p. 200 et seq. Ou Nouvelles Annales de Mathématiques Volume 14, p. 200 et seq (1852).
 Georges Maupin, Opinions et curiosités touchant la mathématique (deuxième série) d'après les ouvrages français des XVIe, XVIIe et XVIIIe siècle, édité à Paris chez Naud (1898). pp. 230–243.

17th-century French mathematicians
French women scientists
French women mathematicians
17th-century women scientists